Parkwood Christian Academy (PCA) was a private Christian school located in Lilburn, Georgia, United States, from 1994 through 2011.

It provided supplementary classes at the elementary through high school level (3rd - 12th grades) for homeschooled and formerly homeschooled students.  PCA was accredited by the Accredited Commission for Independent Studies (ACIS).

PCA was founded by Phyllis Maxwell, who offered academic and career counseling in addition to her duties as headmaster.  Classes offered by PCA were taught by certified and/or degreed teachers, and include biology, chemistry, life and earth sciences; pre-algebra, algebra I & II, trigonometry and pre-calculus; U.S. government/economics; high school English; and elementary and high school Spanish.

Homeschooled students who took classes at PCA were enabled through its accreditation to apply to public colleges in Georgia without the additional testing procedures sometimes required of them.

Parkwood Christian Academy also offered an SAT preparation course, PSAT testing, a drug and alcohol program, and private tutoring.

PCA's mascot was the eagle.

Additional facts 
 Some students continue to refer to PCA as "The Basement," due to the school's humble location at inception.
 Although the official mascot was the eagle, Pepper, the dog owned by the Maxwell family, periodically goes into the basement to see everyone there, and therefore was considered the true mascot by some students.
 PCA was considered to be harder than some colleges, i.e. Georgia Perimeter College and Georgia Gwinnett College.

External links 
 Official Parkwood Christian Academy website

References 

Christian schools in Georgia (U.S. state)
Educational institutions established in 1994
Schools in Gwinnett County, Georgia
Private high schools in Georgia (U.S. state)
Private middle schools in Georgia (U.S. state)
Private elementary schools in Georgia (U.S. state)
1994 establishments in Georgia (U.S. state)